Ice hockey at the 2013 Winter Universiade was held from December 10 through December 21 at the Municipal Ice Arena in Cavalese and Gianmario Scola Ice Hockey Arena in Val di Fassa (men's matches) and Ice Stadium in Pergine Valsugana (women's matches). The selection of participating teams - 12 in the men's tournament (including hosting Italy) and six in the women's tournament - was announced on July 31, 2013 while the draw to place the teams into their assigned pools took place on September 28, 2013.

Venues

Men

Preliminary round
Twelve participating teams were placed in the following three groups. After playing a round-robin, the top two teams in each group, plus the top two third-place teams, advanced to the quarterfinals.

Teams received 3 points for a regulation win, 2 points for an overtime/shootout win and 1 point for an overtime/shootout loss. Teams received 3 points for a regulation win, 2 points for an overtime/shootout win and 1 point for an overtime/shootout loss. They were seeded for the playoffs based first on placement within their pool, then by point total, then by fewest goals against, then by goal differential.

All game box scores via winteruniversiade2013.sportresult.com.

Group A 

All times are local (UTC+1).

Group B 

All times are local (UTC+1).

Group C 

All times are local (UTC+1).

9th–12th placement round
All times are local (UTC+1).

11th place match

9th place match

Playoff round

All times are local (UTC+1).

Quarterfinals

5th–8th placement matches

7th place match

5th place match

Semifinals

Bronze medal match

Gold medal match

Final standings

Scoring leaders
List shows the top skaters sorted by points, then goals.

GP = Games played; G = Goals; A = Assists; Pts = Points; +/− = Plus/minus; PIM = Penalties in minutes; POS = Position
Source: universiadetrentino.org

Leading goaltenders
Only the top six goaltenders, based on save percentage, who have played at least 40% of their team's minutes, are included in this list.

TOI = Time on ice (minutes:seconds); SA = Shots against; GA = Goals against; GAA = Goals against average; Sv% = Save percentage; SO = Shutouts
Source: universiadetrentino.org

Women

Preliminary round

Six participating teams were placed into a single group. After playing a round-robin, the teams ranked first through fourth advanced to the semifinals.

Teams received 3 points for a regulation win, 2 points for an overtime/shootout win and 1 point for an overtime/shootout loss. They were seeded for the playoffs first by point total, then by fewest goals against.

All game box scores via winteruniversiade2013.sportresult.com.

All times are local (UTC+1).

Playoff round

* denotes shootout victory

All times are local (UTC+1).

Semifinals

5th place match

Bronze medal match

Gold medal match

Final standings

Scoring leaders
List shows the top skaters sorted by points, then goals.

GP = Games played; G = Goals; A = Assists; Pts = Points; +/− = Plus/minus; PIM = Penalties in minutes; POS = Position
Source: universiadetrentino.org

Leading goaltenders
Only the top six goaltenders, based on save percentage, who have played at least 40% of their team's minutes, are included in this list.

TOI = Time on ice (minutes:seconds); SA = Shots against; GA = Goals against; GAA = Goals against average; Sv% = Save percentage; SO = Shutouts
Source: universiadetrentino.org

Medalists

Medal table

References

External links
Result Book – Ice Hockey

2013 Winter Universiade
2013 in ice hockey
2013
2013